Chen Xiaojia is the name of:

 Chen Xiaojia (basketball) (born 1988), Chinese basketball player
Chen Xiaojia (badminton) (born 1991), Chinese badminton player